Pantoporia karwara, the Karwar lascar, is a species of nymphalid butterfly found in tropical and subtropical Asia.

References

Pantoporia
Butterflies of Asia
Fauna of Pakistan
Butterflies described in 1906